Luka Zagar (born June 25, 1978, in Ljubljana, Slovenia) is a Slovenian professional ice hockey player.

Career statistics

Austrian Hockey League

References

1978 births
Slovenian ice hockey left wingers
Living people
Sportspeople from Ljubljana
HDD Olimpija Ljubljana players
HK Acroni Jesenice players
KHL Medveščak Zagreb players
HK Slavija Ljubljana players
Slovenian expatriate ice hockey people
Slovenian expatriate sportspeople in Croatia
Expatriate ice hockey players in Croatia